Sør-Aukra is a former municipality in Møre og Romsdal county, Norway.  Sør Aukra Municipality existed from 1924 until 1965 when it was merged into Midsund Municipality (now part of Molde Municipality).  The  municipality consisted of the entire island of Otrøya, the eastern part of Midøya island, and some small surrounding islands at the entrance to the large Romsdal Fjord.  The village of Midsund was the administrative centre of the municipality.

History
The municipality of Sør-Aukra was established on 1 January 1924 when the old Aukra Municipality was divided into Sør-Aukra (in the south) and Nord-Aukra (in the north). Initially, Sør-Aukra Municipality had a population of 1,395. During the 1960s, there were many municipal mergers across Norway due to the work of the Schei Committee. On 1 January 1965, Sør-Aukra was merged with the island of Dryna and the rest of the island of Midøya, both from Vatne Municipality, to form the new Midsund Municipality. Prior to the merger, Sør-Aukra had a population of 1,912. At the same time, Nord-Aukra changed its name back to Aukra.

Government
All municipalities in Norway, including Sør-Aukra, are responsible for primary education (through 10th grade), outpatient health services, senior citizen services, unemployment and other social services, zoning, economic development, and municipal roads.  The municipality is governed by a municipal council of elected representatives, which in turn elects a mayor.

Municipal council
The municipal council  of Sør-Aukra was made up of representatives that were elected to four year terms.  The party breakdown of the final municipal council was as follows:

See also
List of former municipalities of Norway

References

Molde
Former municipalities of Norway
1924 establishments in Norway
1965 disestablishments in Norway